Pradhāna (Sanskrit: प्रधान) is an adjective meaning "most important, prime, chief or major". The Shatapatha Brahmana (शतपथ ब्राह्मण) gives its meaning as "the chief cause of the material nature" (S.B.7.15.27) or "the creative principle of nature" (S.B.10.85.3). The Samkhya School of Indian philosophy employs the word to mean the creative principle of nature, as the original root of matter, the Prime Matter but which according to Badarayana’s logic is the unintelligent principle which cannot be the one consisting of bliss.

Overview

Kapila introduces the concept of Pradhana, the matter from which the world has been created. According to the Samkhya School, Pradhana is the original root of matter defined as the state of equilibrium of the three Gunas – Sattva, Rajas and Tamas, the three modes of Prakrti ('material nature'). Prakrti is eternal and all-pervading, unlimited and the material cause, eternally producing everything but insentient. Purusha is unproduced, free from all action and modification, without attributes, all-pervading consciousness, individual and separate for each body. Pradhana is called anumanam, 'the inferred entity', meaning purely hypothetical, which when manifest becomes the efficient and the material cause of creation.

Rig Vedic concept of the Creator and Creation

Rishi  Madhucchanda tells us (Rig Veda I.ii.5) that –

वायविन्द्रश्च चेतथः सुतानां वाजिनीवसू |
तावा यातमुप द्रवत् ||

the entire Solar system and all those forces supporting it which are themselves supported by the Creator render all created objects visible i.e. known, to all living beings who in their turn are drawn towards those very objects. This means that all objects whether living or not living, moving or not moving, act, interact and co-act in accordance with their respective qualities and tendencies, and become involved in works, which is so because the Creator having created all this entered into the created as the efficient and material cause of creation; the created is the whole universe of objects. And, Rishi Vishwakarma Bhovana informs (Rig Veda X.82.5) that –

परो दिवो पर एना पृथिव्या परो देवेभिरसुरैर्यदस्ति |
कं स्विद्गर्भं प्रथमं दध्र आपो यत्र देवाः समपश्यन्त विश्वे ||

the Supreme Being (the formless object of devotion) is beyond the infinite space, far away from this earth, beyond all things and beings yet is to be found within the tiniest of tiny particles of matter known to all ordinary beings, learned beings and the Devatas (Gods), but it is a well established fact that origination belongs to all entities that have existence (Gaudapada in his Karika on the Mandukya Upanishad I.6). The Creator caused all things to be made from the eternal cause i.e. from the primordial undefined matter प्रतनस्य औकसः (Rig Veda I.30.9). Kapila, the founder of the atheistic Samkhya philosophy, does not refer to God as the Creator of this world of objects, and Samkhyapravachana Sutra states - ईश्वरासिद्धे: ||९२|| - also interpreted to mean - there is no proof for the existence of God. Kanada admitting the existence of God believes that from the knowledge of the Tattvas arises the non-apprehensiveness of the un-seeable one who is other than the present body (Vaiseshika Sutra V.ii.18). The roots of the Samkhya Philosophy are found in Rig Veda Suktas 129 and 221, in Atharvaveda X.8 and X.43, in the Shatapatha Brahmana and the Sankhayana Brahmana in which the Atman is called the twenty-fifth principle, and its origin in the Upanishads. Sankara identifies Kapila with the Vedic Kapila who burnt the sons of Sagara and the Buddhist legends mention Kapila as a predecessor of Gautama Buddha. Kapila’s disciple Asuri and Pancashikha are mentioned in the Mahabharata (St.12.29).

Samkhya concept

The term, Samkhya, derived from the word, Sankhya (numbers), refers to the sense of thinking with regard to some basic principles of the knowledge of Purusha, and to counting with regard to the twenty-four principles of Prakrti, and therefore, to 'Right Discrimination'. The reading of the texts indicate that Chandogya Upanishad, Katha Upanishad and Shvetashvatara Upanishad were written after the formulation of the Samkhya System of Thought. The sage of the Shvetashvatara Upanishad (VI.16) calls God – प्रधानक्षेत्रज्ञपतिर्गुणेशः the Lord of Pradhana or Prakrti, of individual souls and of the Gunas; the word Kapilam of (Sh. U. St.V.2) is said to refer to the originator of the Samkhya philosophy.  This system, close to Vedanta, is realistic and dualistic. Its concept of creation is based on the premises that a thing which has never existed can never be brought into existence, and that the effect which is ever existent before the operation of the cause is always related to the cause. The Samkhya system follows the logic of the then generally accepted conclusions that Inference (anumanam) results from perception (drstm), both are means of cognition (pramanas) of existence (bhava); and non-existence (abhava) is only a form of perception. Primordial Nature or matter (pradhana), Spirit (Purusha) and the rest (Mahat etc.) which exist cannot be perceived by the senses because of their extreme subtlety and not due to non-existence. The Manifested (vyaktam) possessing and dependent on a cause is not eternal, not pervasive, active, inferable, having parts and subordinate; the Unmanifested (avyaktam) is reverse of this. Ishvara Krishna thereafter, explains (Samkhya Karika Sloka11):

त्रिगुणमविवेकी विषयः सामान्यमचेतनं प्रसवधर्मि |
व्यक्तं तथा प्रधानं तद्विपरीतस्तथा च पुमान् ||

that the Primordial Nature (pradhanam) like the Manifested is also constituted by three Gunas, non-distinguishable (it cannot be distinguished from itself and so also Mahat and the rest from pradhana), objective, common, non-intelligent and prolific, but the Spirit (pumanam or Purusha) is the reverse of both of them yet similar in some respect. The three gunas though contradictory to each other co-operate and put into effect their single purpose of bringing about emancipation of the Purusha. The existence of indistinguishability etc.; in the Manifest and the Unmanifest is proved from their being constituted of the three gunas and from the absence of their reverse; the existence of the Unmanifest is proved from the effects possessing the attributes of their cause. Manifest is directly perceived because of pleasure, pain and delusion; in the case of Purusha these are non-existent. The 'cause' (unmanifest) must possess the qualities of its 'effect' (manifest), therefore, Pradhana exists. The Unmanifest cause exists because of 1) the finite nature of special objects, 2) homogeneity, 3) evolution being due to the efficiency of cause, 4) the differentiation between cause and effect, 5) the non-difference or merging of the whole world of effects, 6) its operation through the three attributes (gunas) by combination and modification, through difference arising from diverse nature of several receptacles of these attributes. Purusha exists because 1) the avyakta, pradhana, mahat, ahankara and other products exist for the sake of another, 2) of the absence of three gunas and other properties, 3) there must be some controller, 4) there must be some experience, and 5) of the tendency of activities towards final beatitude. Balarama says Pradhana is three gunas itself and therefore cannot be their adhara ('basis' or 'source') whereas Vamsidhara says that gunas are in the form of karana in Mahat, etc.; and in the form of samuha in Pradhana.

Badarayana’s refutation of Pradhana

Ramanuja and Sankara interpret the word asabadam (meaning not mentioned in the Upanishads) in ईक्षतेर्नाशब्दम् (B.S.I.i.5) to mean the Pradhana of the Samkhyas and na (meaning not) as the denial of Pradhana being the cause of the universe because it is not mentioned in the Upanishads, and from the word 'ikshate' ( meaning seeing or thinking) reference by Badarayana to Brahman who visualized and created the Vital force (Prana)(Prasna Upanishad VI.3-4), created the worlds (Aitareya Upanishad I.i.1-2) is to be understood. Sankara in his commentary on this and the following sutras explains a) insentient Pradhana cannot illuminate Sattva that can only be illumined by the consciousness of the witnessing Soul, b) an insentient Pradhana cannot have the sentient Atman or Brahman as its essence, c) Atman implies a conscious entity in the primary sense which can instruct; here Brahman is that Existence which visualizes and not Pradhana,  d) Pradhana is not even indirectly referred to by the Upanishads as the sentient Atman; even if it is the cause of all objects of experience it will still remain unknown because the experiencing subjects as a class are not modifications of Pradhana, e) sentient beings can merge only in a conscious entity which Pradhana is not, f) consciousness is apprehended uniformly as the cause, g) Shvetashvatara Upanishad (VI.9) introduces the all-knowing God, who has no master or originator or ordainer, as the cause and the ordainer  of the masters of the organs. The Sutra I.i.12 – आनन्दमयोऽभ्यासात्, is textually wrong, it should have been worded anandobhyasat because ananda is absolute freedom and if ananda is embodied it becomes non-limited i.e. subjected to limitation.

The inert Pradhana cannot create because activity is necessary for creation; it is not a directive intelligent entity for initiating activity, and because there is no external agency to urge it to act or restrain it from action. A spontaneous action of Pradhana is not possible; it cannot modify in the absence of purpose and it cannot have a desire to evolve. Purusa is intelligent and indifferent but there is no third agency to bring Purusa near Pradhana to effect a connection between the two for starting the activity of creation. Pradhana cannot be active because there can be no relation of principal or subordinate guna when the gunas are in equilibrium to constitute Pradhana. Creation cannot proceed from inert or dead matter.

Madhvacharya’s interpretation

The Brahma Sutras of Badarayana represents the first comprehensive treatment in a systematic manner of the vast corpus of Vedic Thought. The Vedic tradition viewed truth as ‘subsisting eternally as subtle sound’ heard and then conveyed to others via speech. However, Madhva, the founder of Tattvavada (Realism), interprets the word asabadam to refer to Brahman who is inexpressible because he is an object of knowledge. Madhva contends that an object presented in illusory perception  is an absolute unreality and no illusion can be explained without the acceptance of two necessary reals – adhisthana ('substratum') and pradhana ('prototype') of the superimposed object (aropya). The Dvaita school of Hindu philosophy, Ishvara, the cause of the universe is the svatantra tattva ('independent reality') and the created universe is the asvatantra tattva ('dependent reality') which is a transformation of Pradhana ('matter').

References

Rigveda
Vedanta
Hindu philosophical concepts
Sanskrit words and phrases